Mirabito Range is a narrow, northwest-trending mountain range, 64 km (40 mi) long and 6 km (4 mi) wide, standing between the upper part of Lillie Glacier and the Greenwell Glacier in northern Victoria Land, Antarctica. The range is part of the Concord Mountains.

The range was mapped by the USGS from surveys and U.S. Navy aerial photography, 1960–63. Named by US-ACAN for Lt. Cdr. John A. Mirabito, USN, staff Meteorological Officer on four Deep Freeze Operations, 1955–59.

See also
Red Rock Peak

References

Mountain ranges of Victoria Land
Pennell Coast